The naval battle at Plum Point Bend took place on the Mississippi River between ships of the Confederate River Defense Fleet, which consisted of a number of wooden sidewheel paddleboats converted to naval rams, and ships of the Union Mississippi River Squadron, which consisted of a number of ironclads, approximately four miles above Fort Pillow, Tennessee on May 10, 1862, during the American Civil War.

Battle
Following the fall of Island No. 10 and other Confederate losses to the north and east of Confederate Fort Pillow, the Union squadron proceeded down river. Early in the morning on May 10, 1862, the Confederate River Defense Fleet surprised and attacked the Union squadron that had moved up to support mortar boat attacks on Fort Pillow. The Union ships then moved away to shallow water. Unable to pursue due to deeper draft, the Confederate ships then withdrew. Cincinnati and Mound City were badly damaged and sunk. Only one ship of the rebel fleet, the General Earl Van Dorn, avoided being disabled by superior federal firepower. The Union squadron was able to proceed down river and attack the Confederate squadron during the Battle of Memphis the following month. Both Cincinnati and Mound City were later raised and placed back in service.

References
National Park Service history of Fort Pillow
Reports on the Naval Engagement at Plum Point

Lauderdale County, Tennessee
Naval battles of the American Civil War
1862 in Tennessee
Riverine warfare
Battles of the American Civil War in Tennessee
May 1862 events